Siraj may refer to:

 Siraj region, an area of Jammu, India
 Siraj (director), Indian film director
 Siraj (name), a list of notable people with Siraj as a given name or surname
 Siraj (1948 film), a 1948 Indian film directed by Phani Sarma
 Siraj (1988 film), a 1988 Indian film